Keshtaz (also Romanized as Keshtāz; also known as Keshtār) is a village in Avajiq-e Shomali Rural District, Dashtaki District, Chaldoran County, West Azerbaijan Province, Iran. At the 2006 census, its population was 28, in 7 families.

References 

Populated places in Chaldoran County